Gruppo Sportivo Dilettantistico Rosignano Sei Rose (usually referred to as simply Rosignano) is an Italian association football club, based in Rosignano Marittimo, Tuscany. Rosignano currently plays in Eccellenza.

History 
The club was founded in 1922 as Gruppo Sportivo Solvay and later changed denomination to Rosignano Solvay.

Colors and badge 
The team's colors are white and navy blue.

References

External links
Official homepage

Football clubs in Tuscany
Association football clubs established in 1922
1922 establishments in Italy